Jurema is a municipality/city in the state of Pernambuco in Brazil. The population in 2020, according with IBGE was 15,431 inhabitants and the total area is 148.25 km2.

Geography

 State - Pernambuco
 Region - Agreste of Pernambuco
 Boundaries - Panelas   (N);  Canhotinho   (S);  Quipapá   (E);   Ibirajuba  (W).
 Area - 148.25 km2
 Elevation - 723 m
 Hydrography - Mundaú and Una rivers
 Vegetation - Subperenifólia forest
 Clima  -  Hot and humid
 Annual average temperature - 21.9 c
 Distance to Recife - 204 km

Economy

The main economic activities in Jurema are related with agribusiness, especially creations of cattle, goats, sheep, chickens; and plantations of manioc and beans.

Economic Indicators

Economy by Sector
2006

Health Indicators

References

Municipalities in Pernambuco